John Heath may refer to:

Politicians
John Hethe, English member of parliament (MP) for Salisbury
 John Heath, member of parliament for Clitheroe, 1661–1679
 John Heath (later John Duke) (1717–1775), MP 1747–1768
 John Heath (politician) (1758–1810), United States politician
 John S. Heath (1807–1849), American physician and politician in Michigan

Others
 John Heath (entomologist) (1922–1987), British entomologist
 John Heath (cricketer, born 1807) (1807–1878), English cricketer
 John Heath (cricketer, born 1891) (1891–1972), English cricketer
 John Heath (cricketer, born 1978), English cricketer
 John Heath (judge) (1736–1816), English judge
 John Benjamin Heath (1790–1879), Governor of the Bank of England
 John Heath (footballer) (born 1936), English footballer
 John Heath (1914–1956), English racing driver
 John Heath, duelled with Oliver Hazard Perry, 1817
 John Heath-Stubbs (1918–2006), English poet and translator
 Jack Heath (born 1986), writer of young adult fiction
 John Heath, victim of lynching in the Bisbee massacre in 1884